Patrick Simmons (born October 19, 1948) is an American musician best known as a founding member of the rock band The Doobie Brothers (whom he was inducted as a member of into the Rock and Roll Hall of Fame in 2020). Born in Aberdeen, Washington, he has been the only consistent member of the band throughout their tenure.

Early Life 
Simmons was raised in San Jose, California, where his father was a high school educator. He attended San José State University where he was a member of the Theta Xi fraternity and lived for many years in Santa Cruz County, California.

The Doobie Brothers

Formation 
In 1970, a California-based power trio consisting of Tom Johnston, Skip Spence, and John Hartman teamed up with Simmons to form a group together. They would call themselves “The Doobie Brothers”, after their friend Keith "Dyno" Rosen, who either lived with or next to the band told them:

Initial Success 
Simmons wrote and sang many songs for the Doobie Brothers, including "South City Midnight Lady", "Dependin' On You", "Echoes of Love", "Wheels of Fortune" and "Black Water", the group's first #1 record.

Patrick sang lead on many Doobie Brothers songs, such as Listen to the Music.

Disbanding and Reforming 
The Doobie Brothers initially disbanded in 1982, largely on account of Simmons' decision to leave the group, as he was its sole remaining original member at the time (Dave Shogren left in 1971, Tom Johnston in 1977, and John Hartman in 1979).

The Doobie Brothers reformed again in 1987, and the band are still touring, as of 2023, being led by Simmons and Johnston. Their latest album was Liberté (2021).

Doobie Brothers Accolades 
The group's 1978 studio album, Minute by Minute, which reached number one for five weeks, and won the band a Grammy for Best Pop Vocal Performance by a Duo or Group, while the single "What A Fool Believes" from the album won three Grammys itself.

The Doobie Brothers were inducted into the Vocal Group Hall of Fame in 2004, and the Rock and Roll Hall of Fame on November 7, 2020. The group has sold more than 40 million albums worldwide.

Solo Works 
In 1983, Simmons released his first solo album, Arcade, on Elektra Records. It yielded his only top 40 hit, "So Wrong", which peaked at #30 on the Billboard Hot 100. "So Wrong" was also a surprise hit on the US dance/disco chart, peaking at #8. The album was reissued on compact disc in Japan in the early 1990s and again in 2007, by the label Wounded Bird Records. Simmons also formed the band Skin Suit during this period. In 1998, Simmons released a second solo album titled Take Me to the Highway.

Personal life
In 1981 he opened a vintage motorcycle shop with author William J. Craddock. Simmons moved to Mendocino County, California in 1990 after the Loma Prieta earthquake of 1989, and later to Hawaii.

He met his wife Cristine in 1989 in Sturgis, South Dakota at the Sturgis Motorcycle Rally. They both enjoy riding antique motorcycles, participating in the 2014 Motorcycle Cannonball Endurance Ride. They participated in the 2016 Motorcycle Cannonball, riding from Atlantic City, New Jersey to San Diego, California.

With Tom Johnston, Simmons wrote Long Train Runnin': Our Story of The Doobie Brothers (2022).

Discography

With the Doobie Brothers

Solo albums
1983 - Arcade
1995 - Take Me to the Highway

Solo singles
1983 - "So Wrong"
1983 - "Don't Make Me Do It"

References

1948 births
American rock guitarists
American male guitarists
Living people
People from Aberdeen, Washington
Musicians from San Jose, California
American male singers
American rock singers
Elektra Records artists
The Doobie Brothers members
Lead guitarists
Fingerstyle guitarists
Guitarists from California
20th-century American guitarists
20th-century American male musicians
The Sky Kings members